Hirsute Pursuit is an American industrial/EDM music group from New York City, formed by Bryin Dall and Harley Phoenix in 2006-2007. They frequently collaborate with artists such as Peter Christopherson (before his death in 2010) and Boyd Rice. Thematically, they focus on homosexuality, gay sex, and the gay bear subculture. Due to the controversial and explicit nature of many of their songs, their videos have frequently been removed from YouTube.  They are known for their cover of David Bowie's 1979 song Boys Keep Swinging with Boyd Rice on vocal.

Live performances 
Hirsute Pursuit's live performances often contain overt displays of bondage and sex acts, with Phoenix usually dressed in full leather gear, including mask. Explicit and pornographic images are usually projected behind them.

Discography

Studio albums 
 That Hole Belongs To Me (2007) 
 Help Is On The Way (Maybe Midnight) (2009)
 Tighten That Muscle Ring (July 10, 2012) 
 Westboro Bathroom Blues (2012) 
 Revel In Your Ability To Accessorize My Pleasure (2013)
 Dogs Can Grow Beards All Over (2014)

EPs 
 Boyd Keeps Swinging (September 16, 2012)

References

External links 
 Hirsute Pursuit discography on Discogs
 Hirsute Pursuit on Facebook
 Hirsute Pursuit on Myspace
 Hirsute Pursuit on ReverbNation

Musical groups established in 2006
Musical groups from New York (state)
American industrial music groups
American electronic dance music groups